Portobello railway station may refer to three former stations in Britain:

Portobello railway station (Wolverhampton)
Portobello railway station (E&DR), an Edinburgh and Dalkeith Railway station in Edinburgh
Portobello railway station (NBR), a North British Railway station in Edinburgh